Beth Lygoe (born 17 September 1981) is a British born Saint Lucian sailor. She competed in Women's Laser Radial at the 2011 ISAF Sailing World Championships. She competed in Women's Laser Radial at the 2012 Summer Olympics finishing with a rank of 37th.

References

External links
Beth Lygoe  at London2012.com

1981 births
Living people
Olympic sailors of Saint Lucia
Saint Lucian female sailors (sport)
People from Broxbourne
Sailors at the 2012 Summer Olympics – Laser Radial
Saint Lucian sportswomen
Sportspeople from London